Gustav Harald Edelstam (March 17, 1913 – April 16, 1989) was a Swedish diplomat. During World War II he earned the nickname Svarta nejlikan ("the Black Pimpernel," a reference to the Scarlet Pimpernel) for helping hundreds of Norwegian Jews, SOE agents, and saboteurs escape from the Germans. During the early 1970s he was stationed in Santiago, Chile, and became known as the "Raoul Wallenberg of the 1970s" when he helped over 1,200 Chileans, hundreds of Cuban diplomats and civilians, and 67 Uruguayan and Bolivian refugees escape persecution by dictator Augusto Pinochet.

Early life
Harald Edelstam was born in Stockholm, Sweden, and was the son of chamberlain Fabian Edelstam and Hilma Dickinson. He was the older brother of the ambassador Axel Edelstam and grandson of member of parliament Ernst Edelstam. Edelstam passed studentexamen in 1933 and earned a Candidate of Law degree in Stockholm in 1939 before becoming employed as an attaché at the Ministry for Foreign Affairs in Stockholm the same year.

Career
Harald Edelstam served in Rome in 1939 and the Foreign Ministry in Stockholm in 1940, in Berlin in 1941, and in Oslo in 1942 where Edelstam became acting Second Vice Consul in 1944. As a diplomat in Nazi-occupied Norway, Edelstam saved the lives of hundreds of Jews and anti-Quisling freedom fighters.

He was acting Second Secretary at the Foreign Ministry in Stockholm in 1944 and was Secretary to the Minister for Foreign Affairs from 1946 to 1948. Edelstam was Second Secretary at the Foreign Ministry in Stockholm in 1946, acting First Secretary in 1948 and First Legation Secretary in The Hague in 1949 and in Warsaw in 1952. He was then First Secretary at the Foreign Ministry in Stockholm in 1953 and acting Director there in 1956. In 1958 Edelstam was sent to Vienna as Embassy Counsellor and in 1962 to Istanbul as Consul General. He stayed in Istanbul until 1965 and was thereafter ambassador in Jakarta, also accredited to Manila from 1966 to 1968. Edelstam was then sent to Central America where he was ambassador in Guatemala City, also accredited to Managua, San José, San Salvador, and Tegucigalpa from 1969 to 1972. In 1972 he was sent to Santiago de Chile as ambassador.

After the 1973 military coup against Chilean President Salvador Allende, the Cuban Embassy was under fire by tanks and Cubans were returning fire from the windows; Edelstam took a Swedish flag in hand and walked in front of the tanks as bullets hurled past. He fetched the Cubans out of the embassy and took them to the Swedish Embassy, then got them out of Chile to safety. After the incident, the Cuban Embassy in Santiago de Chile remained under Swedish protecting power for 18 years until 1991. Prime Minister Olof Palme gave him all his support.

Edelstam also helped many other Cubans to escape from Chile and was honored by Fidel Castro as a hero. Due to his remarkable courage and moral integrity, Edelstam is today considered as a true modern-day hero among millions around Latin America, and particularly so among the hundreds of thousands of Chileans who were forced into exile by the dictatorial regime.

The Chilean military regime did not appreciate Edelstam's engagement and declared him persona non grata in December 1973. Edelstam came back to Stockholm and was available for the Foreign Minister during 1974 before being sent as ambassador to Algiers on the advice of Edelstam's greatest enemy, diplomat Wilhelm Wachtmeister. He left the position and retired in 1979.

Personal life

He was married 1939–1958 to Countess Louise von Rosen (born 1918), the daughter of Count Hans von Rosen and Dagmar (née Wikström) and 1959–1963 to Natascha Michéew. Edelstam married a third time in 1981 with Christine Colmain. In the marriage with von Rosen he had three sons: Carl (born 1941), Hans (born 1943) and Erik (born 1946). Edelstam died from cancer in 1989.

Popular culture
A film about Edelstam's activities in Chile, The Black Pimpernel, was released in September 2007. He was portrayed by Michael Nyqvist.

In 2019, he was portrayed by Mikael Persbrandt in Finnish-Chilean television series Invisible Heroes, depicting his efforts with Finnish Chargé d'affaires Tapani Brotherus to save refugees from Chile during the military coup.

Awards and decoration
Edelstam's awards:
Knight of the Order of the Polar Star
Commander of the Order of Orange-Nassau
Commander of the Austrian Order of Merit
Knight, First Class of the Order of St. Olav
Officer of the Order of the White Elephant
Knight of the Order of the Dannebrog
Knight of the Order of the Crown of Italy

See also
 Edelstam Prize
 Roberto Kozak
 Raoul Wallenberg

References

Further reading

External links

Isabel Allende interview with Amnesty International Denmark Isabel Allende on Harald Edelstamm in an interview with Amnesty International.
Harald Edelstam on P3 Dokumentär

1913 births
1989 deaths
Swedish people of World War II
Consuls-general of Sweden
Ambassadors of Sweden to Indonesia
Ambassadors of Sweden to Guatemala
Ambassadors of Sweden to Chile
Ambassadors of Sweden to Algeria
Swedish humanitarians
Deaths from cancer in Sweden
Knights of the Order of the Polar Star